Varchas is a Hindu deity. He is one of the eight Vasus. He is the son of Chandra, the moon god, and Rohini, a daughter of Daksha and the chief consort of Chandra. According to the Mahabharata, Arjuna's and Subhadra's son, Abhimanyu, is regarded to be his incarnation.

Legend 
According to the Mahabharata, a conference once took place among the devas and Chandra, where it was proposed that Varchas be incarnated on earth for the destruction of wicked men. Chandra did not wish to be separated from his beloved son, but consented to the proposition, on the condition that Varchas would not leave him for more than sixteen years. Accordingly, during the Dvapara Yuga, Varchas was born as Abhimanyu, the son of the Pandava prince, Arjuna, and the Yadava princess, Subhadra. Abhimanyu was slain when he was sixteen fighting in the Kurukshetra War.

Reference

Bibliography

Hindu gods